La Viña Winery is an American winery in La Union, New Mexico. It was established in 1977 and is the oldest continuously running winery in New Mexico. The winery was bought by Ken and Denise Stark in 1993. They moved the winery, originally located in southern New Mexico, to La Union, building a new winery but retaining the old name. The winery co-sponsored a grape-growing workshop with New Mexico State University's Cooperative Extension Service and Texas Cooperative Extension in September 2004.

See also

List of wineries in New Mexico
New Mexico wine

References

Further reading

Interviews

External links

1977 establishments in New Mexico
Tourist attractions in Doña Ana County, New Mexico
Wineries in New Mexico